The Noah Curtis House is a historic house located at 313 Franklin Street in Quincy, Massachusetts.

Description and history 
The -story Federal period Cape style house, built in 1795 by Noah Curtis, is the oldest Cape-style house in South Quincy. Noah Curtis was an early local pioneer in the manufacture of boots and shoes, which became one of Quincy's major industries. The house is five bays wide, with a center entrance and a centrally-placed chimney. The entry is sheltered by a later portico, and there are additions to the right side and rear.

The house was listed on the National Register of Historic Places on September 20, 1989.

See also
Thomas Curtis House, built nearby by his son
National Register of Historic Places listings in Quincy, Massachusetts

References

Federal architecture in Massachusetts
Houses completed in 1795
Houses in Quincy, Massachusetts
National Register of Historic Places in Quincy, Massachusetts
Houses on the National Register of Historic Places in Norfolk County, Massachusetts